The Alfragide Towers are a set of residential buildings in Alfragide, Amadora, Portugal. The complex consists of three residential towers and a shopping centre at ground level, connecting the three buildings. It also contains an underground car park and a complex of swimming pools, currently unused. It is an example of brutalism-influenced architecture.

Buildings 
The three residential towers have different heights, ranging from 10 to 15 floors. Each tower's footprint is similar to a four-leaf clover, with a central services core featuring stairs, elevators and garbage chutes, and four "subtowers" stemming from the core. The apartments feature different layouts, including single-storey flats and two-storey maisonettes.

The two-storey shopping centre at ground level features shops, cafés, and offices. Until the late 1980s it also featured a cinema, currently closed.

Architecture 
Tomás Taveira was the main architect responsible for the project, while working at Conceição Silva's architectural practice. He cites  James Stirling as his main influence for this project, especially the University of Leicester's Engineering Building. The project also shares similarities with Alison and Peter Smithson's Robin Hood Gardens estate and Denys Lasdun's Keeling House.

Gallery

References 

Buildings and structures in Lisbon District
Brutalist architecture in Portugal